Juan de Aguilar Villaquirán (1564–1618) was a Spanish writer and translator born in Toledo, Spain.  He was the son of the doctor Escalona Alonso Hernández de Aguilar.

16th-century Spanish writers
16th-century male writers
17th-century Spanish writers
People from the Province of Toledo
1564 births
1618 deaths
17th-century male writers